B. R. Grover was an Indian historian specialising in medieval Indian history.

Career
He was a professor of history at the Jamia Millia Islamia University.

He served as the Director of Indian Council of Historical Research (ICHR) for 11 years and was appointed as its chairman in 1999 on a three-year term.

Death
He died of a heart attack in 2001 while serving as the Chairman of the ICHR.

Posthumous publications
Five volumes of Collected Works of Professor B. R. Grover have been published posthumously by Books for All.

References 

2001 deaths
20th-century Indian historians
Historians of South Asia